The Văluța oil field is an oil field located in Crușeț, Gorj County, Romania. It was discovered in 1980 and developed by Petrom. Petrom abandoned the field in 1998 when it was bought by Expert Petroleum. It began production in 1981 and produces oil.

References

Oil fields in Romania